The 2019 Premios Juventud ceremony was held on July 18, 2019. Univision broadcast the show live from the Watsco Center in Miami, Florida. Argentine singer and actress Lali, boy band CNCO and Mexican-American TV presenter Alejandra Espinoza hosted the ceremony.

Premios Juventud aims to inspire, motivate and empower Latino youth to become leaders for change. The awards celebrate the current trends in pop culture, music, digital, fashion, television and social media. Maluma had the most nominations with eight, followed by Bad Bunny behind with seven. Bad Bunny, Anuel AA and Cardi B won the most awards of the night, with three each.

Maluma and Jesse & Joy were the first artists to receive the Agente de Cambio Award honoring their humanitarian work. Two young Latinos, Alondra Toledo and Carlos Osuna, were also honored with the trophy for their leadership and positive contributions to the community.

Performers

Presenters

 Isabela Moner, Eugenio Derbez, Eva Longoria and Jeff Wahlberg – presented Singer + Songwriter + Composer award
 Renata Notni and Sebastián Rulli – introduced Dalex, Sech, Cazzu, Feid and Rafa Pabön
 Sebastián Yatra – presented Best LOL Award
 Pepe Aguilar – introduced Christian Nodal, Ángela Aguilar and Pipe Bueno
 Sebastián Villalobos – introduced CNCO
 Karol Sevilla – introduced Silvestre Dangond and Cedric Gervais

 Mané de la Parra and Michelle Renaud – introduced Sebastián Yatra and Tini
 Cierra Ramirez – introduced Cazzu, Eladio Carrion, Amenazzy and Lyanno
 Maite Perroni – presented Regional Roots 2.0 award
 Amara La Negra and Gerardo Ortiz – introduced Romeo Santos, El Chaval de la Bachata and Frank Reyes
 Jesse & Joy – introduced Daniel Habif
 Pabllo Vittar, Emilia and Chesca – introduced Pedro Capó, Farruko and Lali
 Emilio Osorio and Joaquín Bondoni – introduced Reykon and Maluma

Source:

Nominations
The official nominees were revealed on May 21, 2019. Maluma had the most nominations with eight, followed by Bad Bunny and Daddy Yankee behind with seven each, and Becky G, Anuel AA, J Balvin and Karol G all with six. Anuel AA, Bad Bunny and Cardi B had the most wins of the night, taking home three awards each, followed by Daddy Yankee, Karol G and Maluma, who won two each.

Music

Social

Fashion

Agentes de Cambio Award
Winners:
 Maluma
 Jesse & Joy
 Alejandra Toledo
 Carlos Osuna

Multiple nominations and awards
The following received multiple nominations:

Eight:
Maluma
Seven:
Bad Bunny
Daddy Yankee
Six:
Anuel AA
Becky G
J Balvin
Karol G
Five:
Ozuna
Four:
Jennifer Lopez
Snow

Three:
Ángela Aguilar
Camilo
Cardi B
Chiquis Rivera
Christian Nodal
Farruko
Lali
Manuel Turizo
Mau y Ricky
Natti Natasha
Nicky Jam
Pedro Capó
Sebastián Yatra
T3R Elemento
Thalía

Two:
Banda MS
CNCO
Drake
Juanpa Zurita
Reik
Romeo Santos
Rosalía
Rudy Mancuso
Sebastián Villalobos
Selena Gomez
Tainy

The following won multiple awards:

Three:
Anuel AA
Bad Bunny
Cardi B

Two:
Daddy Yankee
Karol G
Maluma

References

2019 music awards
2019 awards in the United States
2019 in Latin music